Snowboarding was featured as part of the 2003 Asian Winter Games at the Ajigasawa Ski Area in Aomori, Japan. Events were held from 2 February to 4 February 2003.

Women's competitions were conducted demonstration sport. The host nation Japan was the only nation and dominated the competition by winning all three gold medals.

Schedule

Medalists

Medal table

Demonstration events

Medalists

Women's halfpipe
2 February

Women's slalom
4 February

Women's giant slalom
3 February

Participating nations
A total of 26 athletes from 5 nations competed in snowboarding at the 2003 Asian Winter Games:

References
 2003 Asian Winter Games Calendar

 
2003 Asian Winter Games events
2003
Asian Winter Games